John Mead Hallett (9 October 1917, Narrogin, Western Australia – 9 August 1999) was an Australian politician. He was educated at Guildford Grammar School in Perth, after which he became a farmer at Corrigin. He was the director of Farmers' Weekly before becoming President of the Western Australian Western Australian Country Party in 1962; the following year, he relinquished the presidency to run for the Australian House of Representatives in the Liberal-held seat of Canning. Hallett was successful, and held the seat until his defeat in 1974. He died in 1999.

References

National Party of Australia members of the Parliament of Australia
Members of the Australian House of Representatives for Canning
Members of the Australian House of Representatives
1917 births
1999 deaths
People educated at Guildford Grammar School
People from Narrogin, Western Australia
20th-century Australian politicians